Daniel Graham Turner (born 23 June 1998) is an English semi-professional footballer who plays as a forward for  club Leamington.

He turned professional at Port Vale in April 2016, and played on loan at Kidsgrove Athletic and Worcester City during the 2016–17 season. He joined Tamworth on loan in January 2018. He joined Scottish Championship club Falkirk on a six-month loan at the start of the 2018–19 season, which was cut short three months early. He was released by Port Vale and joined Hyde United in August 2019, before moving on to Matlock Town in March 2020. He switched to Hednesford Town in June 2020 and signed with Leamington in January 2021. He won the Birmingham Senior Cup with Leamington in 2022.

Career

Port Vale
Turner began his career as a youth team scholar at Port Vale, and played for the youth team in the 2014 Staffordshire Senior Cup final defeat to Rushall Olympic. He made his debut in the English Football League on 23 April 2016, coming on for Theo Robinson as a late substitute in a 4–1 victory over Rochdale at Vale Park. He signed his first professional contract at the end of the 2015–16 season.

On 9 September 2016, he joined Northern Premier League Division One South club Kidsgrove Athletic on a one-month loan. The following day he scored two goals on his debut for the "Grove" in a 5–0 home win over Chasetown. He scored another two goals in his next league appearance, a 4–3 home defeat to Bedworth United. On 16 January 2017, he joined National League North side Worcester City on a one-month loan, and made his debut later that night in a 1–1 draw at Curzon Ashton. He returned to Vale to become a regular substitute towards the end of the 2016–17 season under caretaker manager Michael Brown. He came close to scoring his first Football League goal against Oxford United on 17 April, but his headed goal was ruled out for offside. He started his first league game five days later, but was forced to spend much of the game up front on his own after strike partner Rigino Cicilia was sent off.

He signed a new one-year contract in May 2017, with the club preparing to start the 2017–18 campaign in EFL League Two following relegation at the end of the previous season. He scored his first goal for the "Valiants" with a header in a 3–1 win at Crawley Town on 5 August. Having failed to establish himself in new manager Neil Aspin's first-team plans, he joined Tamworth of the National League North one a one-month loan deal on 17 January 2018. He arrived at The Lamb Ground in what was an unstable time for the "Lambs", with manager Andy Morrell losing his job due to poor results, and Turner ended up playing just three games for the club.

Turner was loaned to Scottish Championship club Falkirk in June 2018 in a deal to run for the first six months of the 2018–19 season. He missed the start of the league campaign due to a hamstring injury, though the "Bairns" had sacked manager Paul Hartley and replaced him with Ray McKinnon after suffering defeat in their opening three league matches. The loan deal was terminated on 5 October and the terms of the loan meant that he was unable to play for anyone until January. Vale manager John Askey confirmed that he would not be offering Turner a new contract on 16 May.

Non-League
Turner spent time with the Stoke under-23s, Macclesfield Town and Curzon Ashton, before he joined Northern Premier League Premier Division club Hyde United on non-contract terms in August 2019. He scored nine goals in 28 games for the "Tigers", including braces against Ashton United and Basford United. On 12 March 2020, he left Ewen Fields and joined league rivals Matlock Town. However he was only able to make one appearance for the "Gladiators" as the 2019–20 season was formally abandoned due to the COVID-19 pandemic in England just two weeks later.

On 27 June 2020, Turner signed with Southern League Premier Division Central side Hednesford Town, who were managed by former Tamworth boss Andy Morrell. He scored five goals in 12 games for the "Pitmen" before the 2020–21 season was paused due to the ongoing pandemic. He left Hednesford to sign with Leamington of the National League North on 12 January 2021. He scored a penalty on his debut later that day in a 2–1 victory at Chorley. However the 2020–21 National League season was soon brought to a premature end due to the ongoing pandemic. He scored 12 goals in 38 league games in the 2021–22 campaign. He also scored in the final of the Birmingham Senior Cup as the "Brakes" won the trophy with a 3–1 win over Stourbridge at Villa Park.

Style of play
Speaking in April 2016, Port Vale teammate Louis Dodds, described Turner as "a clever player with good vision and a very good finisher. He's very much a modern-day forward."

Career statistics

Honours
Leamington
Birmingham Senior Cup: 2022

References

1998 births
Living people
People from Stone, Staffordshire
English footballers
Association football forwards
Port Vale F.C. players
Kidsgrove Athletic F.C. players
Worcester City F.C. players
Tamworth F.C. players
Falkirk F.C. players
Hyde United F.C. players
Matlock Town F.C. players
Hednesford Town F.C. players
Leamington F.C. players
English Football League players
Northern Premier League players
National League (English football) players
Scottish Professional Football League players
Southern Football League players